Marie Alexandrine Becker (née Petitjean; 14 July 1879 – 11 June 1942), nicknamed The Black Widow, was a Belgian serial killer who was sentenced to death for poisoning eleven people between 1933 and 1936, and attempting to poison five others. Since capital punishment in Belgium had not been applied since 1863, her sentence was commuted to life imprisonment.

Biography 
Marie Petitjean was born in the rural village of Waasmont, Landen municipality. She rarely attended school, having to help her parents in the fields, but nevertheless asked the village priest to teach her writing, reading and arithmetic. At the age of sixteen, she left her family to live with an aunt who ran a rope shop on Saint-Pholien Street in Liège; she often used peket to retain the male clientele. At the age of 17, on 15 August 1896, she met her first lover, a man named Yann, at the Marian feasts in the Outremeuse district. This was the first of a very long series of marriages. In 1900, when she was 21 years old, she began work for a sewing shop. Marie was very passionate about her job and excelled at it. She was considered to be a pretty, lively and joyful woman who pleased the men.

In 1905, at the Universal Exhibition in Liège, she met the man who would become her husband - Charles Becker Sr. At that time, she was climbing the social ladder, going from the status of saleswoman to now managing the fittings in a large fashion store on Pot d'Or Street in Liège. She now had her own home and frequented the wealthy bourgeoisie areas to give her own fashion advice.

She married Charles Becker Sr. in 1906, and the couple soon moved into the house adjoined to the family sawmill, where Mr. Becker and his two sons, Charles Jr. and Gustave, worked. Marie, however, did not get on well with the family, and frequently argued with Léontine, Gustave's wife. Angered, the father threatened Charles Jr. to dismiss his daughter-in-law. who was a charcuterie in Bressoux. Unbeknownst to the family, the trade was rapidly collapsing. Marie then started to cheat on her husband more often, explaining in her trial that "it is not given to all women to resist the advances of men."

In 1912, Charles Sr. died, which let Charles Jr. to resume his duties in the family business. Marie then opened a sewing workshop in one the rooms of the house, bringing in a growing number of customers. She was heavily inspired by the models of Paul Poiret, even copying some of them.

During the First World War, she courted for the Germans; the sawmill was badly hit but its trade continued to flourish. In 1920, she achieved her long-standing goal of opening a fashion business in Liège on Saint-Léonard Street. Success continued, and she then employed four workers. In 1928, she met a lover to whom Marie became extremely and passionately devoted, Maximilien Houdy, who was twenty years younger. However, the Stock Market Crash of 1929 and the dissoluting morals of Becker put an end to her business, whose bankruptcy was pronounced in 1934.

In October 1932, Charles Becker Jr. died as a result of a cancer. Marie then used some of the acquired money to pay off debts and maintain Houdy. In 1933, she relaunched a seamstress day business for wealthy clients. A friend then suggested to her that she broadened her talents and began to take care of court ladies. She thus began to frequent near rich ladies-in-waiting, from whom she borrowed money when she did not reprive them of their titles or jewels. It is this that lead to her life of big spendings.

The Becker Affair 

Marie was arrested on 16 October 1936 as she was preparing her 17th poison of digitalis for a woman named Mrs. Lamy. The subsequent investigation shed light on the murders. She was judged on 7 July 1938, and the following day found guilty of eleven murders, five attempted murders, theft and forgery. She was sentenced to death and, as has been the practice since 1863, her sentence was commutted to life imprisonment. Marie Becker died in the Forest Prison during the Second World War on 11 June 1942.

See also 
 List of serial killers by country
 List of serial killers by number of victims

References

Literature 

 Michael Newton: Die große Enzyklopädie der Serienmörder. Sammler Vlg., 2002, S. 32.
 Peter & Julia Mirakami: 
 Elisabeth Lange, Marie-Alexandrine Petitjean. Veuve Becker (Belgique, 1879-1942), Éditions Jourdan, 2006
 Albert Bouckaert: Marie Becker the Poisoner, Brussels-Paris, 1938
 Elisabeth Lange, The first serial killer, 3rd Edition, 2011

External links 

 Becker auf dunkletage.de
 Marie Becker on a website dedicated to serial killers

1879 births
1942 deaths
20th-century criminals
Belgian female serial killers
People from Liège
Poisoners
Serial killers who died in prison custody